Elm Road Field, Thetford is a  biological Site of Special Scientific Interest on the southern outskirts of Thetford in Norfolk.

This area of open space has grassland with a rich flora. There are a number of uncommon plants, including the nationally endangered field wormwood and the nationally scarce  sickle medick and tower mustard. There are two mature scots pine hedges.

There is access from Laburnum Grove and Barnham Cross Common.

References

Sites of Special Scientific Interest in Norfolk